The 2003 Radio Music Awards was held on October 27, 2003, at the Aladdin Casino & Resort, in Las Vegas, Nevada. The ceremony was broadcast by NBC, and it was hosted by Ryan Seacrest and Brooke Burns.

Performances

Winners and nominees
The nominees in each category were based on radio’s top-playing songs. Radio program and music directors nationwide voted on the winners.

References

2003 music awards
2003 in music
2003 in Nevada